Streets of Broken Lights is a Russian criminal drama-detective TV series anthology about police work in Saint-Petersburg. The pilot episode, known as Menty (literally "Cops") premiered in 1995, while the initial series ran for 16 nonconsecutive seasons from 1998 to 2019, with 500 episodes released overall and making it the longest crime series in Russia. The series eventually spun off two more shows with same and new characters: Deadly Force (2000—2005) and Bandit Petersburg (2000—2007).

Plot
The main series recounts everyday life of a typical district police establishment in Saint-Petersburg, Russia. Police officers have to face uneasy duties, some must go undercover, while others do mostly forensic work. Streets of Broken Lights was inspired in part by a similar series called Petrovka-38, recounting everyday work of a similar unit in Moscow; in part by the blatant crime rate of the 1990s in Russia. Many fictitious cases presented in the show are based on real life cases having occurred during that dangerous period.

Awards
 Grand Prix at the First Interstate  (April 1999) 
 Award TEFI in the nomination best TV show of the year  (May 1999)
 Award TEFI in nomination best feature TV series   (May 1999)

Spin-offs

Main series
Deadly Force (2000–2005)
Bandit Petersburg (2000–2007)

Documentary series
Chronicles of the Deadly Department (2004–2007)
Liteyny, 4 / Liteyny (2009–2014)

Standalone film
Insurers (2011)

References

External links 
 

Channel One Russia original programming
STS (TV channel) original programming
TNT (Russian TV channel) original programming
NTV (Russia) original programming
Films directed by Aleksandr Rogozhkin
Russian crime television series
Russian workplace drama television series
Russian police procedural television series
1998 Russian television series debuts
1990s Russian television series
2000s Russian television series
2010s Russian television series
Television shows set in Saint Petersburg
Fictional portrayals of the Saint Petersburg Police
2019 Russian television series endings